This is a complete list of the stage and broadcast works of the Swiss composer Heinrich Sutermeister (1910–1995).

Sutermeister was notable as a pioneer of radio and television opera. He composed three works for radio and three for television, as well as eight conventional operas, a monodrama and a ballet.

List

References

Sources
Levi, Erik (1992), 'Sutermeister, Heinrich' in The New Grove Dictionary of Opera, ed. Stanley Sadie (London) 
Operone page, accessed 6 April 2011

Lists of operas by composer
 
Lists of compositions by composer